Philippa Jayne Langley  (born 29 June 1962) is a British writer, producer, and Ricardian, who is best known for her role in the discovery and exhumation of Richard III in 2012 (the Looking for Richard project), for which she was awarded an MBE.  Langley has written books, and appeared in film-length documentaries, on the subject of the search for Richard III, as well as being portrayed in the 2022 drama film, The Lost King.

Early life

Langley was born in Kenya and at the age of two moved with her parents to Blackwell, in Darlington, England. In Darlington, she attended Hummersknott School, and Queen Elizabeth Sixth Form College, and embarked on a career in marketing, eventually settling in Edinburgh.

Looking for Richard project

Langley's interest in Richard III began in 1998, when she read American historian Paul Murray Kendall's biography of the King, saying: "... it just blew me away. I thought, this is a man whose real story has never been told on screen, never".  Langley had been diagnosed with ME and had abandoned her job in marketing to write a screenplay about Richard III more aligned with historians such as Kendall. Langley formed the Scottish branch of the Richard III Society. In May 2004, she visited various sites in Leicester associated with Richard III, including the three car-parks identified in 1975 as possible burial locations.  Langley entered the Social Services car park, and at the northern end felt a "strange sensation" come over her, saying "I knew in my innermost being that Richard's body lay there". In 2005, on completing her first draft, she returned to the car park and experienced the same feeling; when she looked down, someone had painted a reserved "R" over the space; she recounted "it told me all I needed to know". 

In 2005, Langley engaged with Dr. John Ashdown-Hill, who had traced Richard's mitochondrial DNA to a living descendant in Canada, thus enabling the identification of any remains. A 2007 dig that failed to find Greyfriars, a possible burial site, prompted further research by Langley, Ashdown-Hill, and independently by Annette Carson, that narrowed the location of Greyfriars to the Social Services car park.  In February 2009, at the Cramond Inn in Edinburgh, Langley formed the Looking for Richard project to get the car park excavated, with Dr. David and Wendy Johnson, and later Ashdown-Hill and Carson, and chair of the Richard III Society, Dr. Phil Stone.

In late 2010, Langley won the backing of Leicester City Council (LCC) CEO Sheila Lock on the basis that Langley would organize a television documentary to promote Leicester's association with Richard III, and that if any remains were found, they would be buried in Leicester Cathedral. LCC would not provide direct funding, but as owners of the car park they were able to approve and license the excavations, and introduce Langley to local state sponsors, particularly Leicester Promotions.  Langley contracted the University of Leicester Archaeological Services (ULAS) to do the excavations. In August 2011, inconclusive ground penetrating radar results led to withdrawals of sponsorship.  Langley led an online crowdfunding appeal to worldwide Richard III Society members, who filled the gap and provided £17,367 of the £32,867 cost for the 2-week excavation. On 25 August 2012, the 527th anniversary of Richard III's death, ULAS dug the first trench over the "R" mark, and after a few hours, discovered a skeleton that turned out to be the remains of Richard III.

Fall-out with the University of Leicester

On 4 February 2013, the University of Leicester presented their results to the world's press (they had funded a 3rd week of excavations, and led the DNA confirmation using Ashton-Hill's work). Langley felt "sidelined" at the presentation, while the University presented itself as "leading" the search (despite their earlier skepticism).  ULAS kept Langley's name off the exhumation licence, even though she was their client; this also gave the University of Leicester control of the remains but inadvertently enabled a legal action by the Plantagenet Alliance that lasted several years.  

In late 2022, the situation flared up with the release of The Lost King, a dramatisation of Langley's search. At the film's release, screenwriter Stephen Frears said: "They [the University] put a poster on the side of a bus saying 'We found the king!'", and "Well, Leicester University is a corporation and this is really about corporatism".  The University issued statements refuting aspects of the dramatisation in the film, while Langley, and the film's producers, issued their own rebuttals, with Frears saying: "nothing has turned up yet which makes me think we got something wrong".

The Richard III Society released a statement in support of the film, including the recognition of Langley and Ashdown-Hill's roles in the discovery, and the recognition of the importance of the financial commitment that worldwide members of the Society made to the success of the project.

Other projects

In 2014, Langley started a project to locate the remains of Henry I of England, who was buried at Reading Abbey, but which later fell into ruin, which became the "Hidden Abbey Project". In 2020, Langley said that she believed that the grave of Henry I was beneath the western car park of the former Reading gaol. In 2021, Charles Spencer, 9th Earl Spencer joined the crowdfunding programme to begin excavating the site.

In 2022, Langley was reported to be leading a "Missing Princes Project" to discover the fate of the Princes in the Tower.

As writer and producer

From August 2011 to February 2013, Langley acted as associate producer of the Channel 4 documentary film, Richard III: The King in the Car Park.  It won the 2013 Royal Television Society award for History, and was nominated for the 2014 BAFTA award for Specialist Factual.  The film was the highest rated specialist factual documentary in Channel 4's history, and led to the folllow up short-documentary film, Richard III: The Unseen Story.

In 2013, Langely co-authored with military historian Michael K. Jones, The King's Grave: The Search for Richard III (the first edition was published in New York with the title The King’s Grave: The Discovery of Richard III's Lost Burial Place and the Clues It Holds). 

In 2013, it was reported that Langley hoped her completed screenplay on Richard III would become a film, with Richard portrayed by English actor Richard Armitage.  She had titled her screenplay, Blood Royal, and based it on Bosworth 1485: Psychology of a Battle, by Michael K. Jones.

In 2014, Langley detailed the years of research behind the Looking For Richard project that took her to the northern end of the car park in Leicester in search of the church and grave in Finding Richard III: The Official Account of Research by the Retrieval & Reburial Project.  The co-authored work includes chapters from Looking For Richard project members, John Ashdown-Hill and David and Wendy Johnson, and was edited by Annette Carson.

In 2022, Langley and Jones re-wrote and expanded their 2013 book under the new title, The Lost King: The Search for Richard III. It was released alongside the film, The Lost King, with Stephen Frears, Steve Coogan and Jeff Pope writing the screenplay, and Sally Hawkins playing Langley.

Personal life

Langley is diagnosed with chronic fatigue syndrome (or ME, for myalgic encephalomyelitis), which is so severe that she had to spend days building up her "sleep-bank" before making excursions to Leicester while researching locations for Richard III's remains.  

She was married but later separated from inventor-husband John Langley; they have two sons.  In 2022, Steve Coogan, who plays John Langley in The Lost King said "... they've got a very interesting relationship because they're not married anymore, but they both still love each other, and they're still in each other's lives", and "I've never seen that depicted on screen before ... and I wanted to just show that."

Awards and honours

 In June 2015, Langley was appointed a Member of the Order of the British Empire (MBE) in the 2015 Birthday Honours for "services to the exhumation and identification of Richard III"; her colleague John Ashdown-Hill was also recognised with an MBE at the same time.

 In March 2015, Leicester Cathedral dedicated the poem Richard that they had commissioned from the poet laureate, Carol Ann Duffy, and which was read by Benedict Cumberbatch at King Richard III's burial, to Langley. 

 In April 2014, a blue plaque was erected at the Cramond Inn to mark where Langley created the Looking for Richard project on 21 February 2009.

 In March 2013, she was awarded Honorary Life Membership of the Richard III Society.

 In October 2012, she was awarded the Robert Hamblin Award by the Richard III Society.

In film

 Langley featured, and acted as co-producer, in the 2013 Channel 4 award-winning documentary film, Richard III: The King in the Car Park.
 Langley featured, and acted as co-producer, in the 2013 Channel 4 follow-up short documentary film, Richard III: The Unseen Story.
 Langley was played by Sally Hawkins in the 2022 comedy-drama film, The Lost King, a dramatisation of her search for Richard III.

Bibliography

See also
King Richard III Visitor Centre, Leicester City
Richard III Experience at Monk Bar, City of York
Ricardian (Richard III)

Notes

References

External links

Looking for Richard Search Team, Richard III Society (2022)
VIDEO: The King's Grave, interview with authors Philippa Langley and Michael Jones, Hodder & Stoughton (September 2013)

Living people
1962 births
People from Darlington
People educated at Hummersknott Academy
Richard III of England
Members of the Order of the British Empire
People with chronic fatigue syndrome
British women historians
Women medievalists
Writers from Darlington
British women non-fiction writers
21st-century British women writers
21st-century British historians
British women film producers